Stephen Robert Purches (born 14 January 1980 in Ilford, England) is an English retired footballer who played mostly for AFC Bournemouth over two spells. He also made over 100 appearances for Leyton Orient. When he retired from football he became the development coach then progressing to first team coach in 2017 at Bournemouth.

Playing career
Purches was a defender who could play at centre back, midfield or full back on either side. He was previously a trainee at West Ham United but left in 2000 after failing to make a single appearance for the first team. He joined AFC Bournemouth where he spent seven years and missed only three league games in his time at the club.

In summer 2007, he rejected a new contract at Bournemouth and left on a free transfer to join Leyton Orient. Purches watched his first football matches at Orient and described his move as being "like coming home". He was also handed the team captaincy when he arrived. After 132 games in all competitions, he was released by manager Russell Slade on 9 May 2010.
On 7 June 2010, Purches re-signed for Bournemouth. On 18 February 2012, Purches broke his leg playing in a match against Rochdale.

Coaching career 
On 19 May 2014, Purches formally retired from playing football due to injury and moved into coaching, taking control of Bournemouth's under-21s.
 
In 2017, Purches was promoted to serve as a first-team coach under Eddie Howe, before again being promoted to assistant manager in 2020, after Howe left and his successors Jason Tindall and Jonathan Woodgate were respectively named manager. He left the club in June 2021 after the appointment of new head coach, Scott Parker.

References

External links

1980 births
English footballers
Living people
West Ham United F.C. players
AFC Bournemouth players
Leyton Orient F.C. players
English Football League players
Footballers from Ilford
AFC Bournemouth non-playing staff
Newcastle United F.C. non-playing staff
Association football midfielders
Association football coaches